Yayāti, is a king in Hindu tradition. He is described to be a Chandravamsha king. He is regarded to be the progenitor of the races of the Yadavas and the Pandavas. 

He is considered in some texts to the son of King Nahusha, and his wife, Ashokasundari, daughter of Shiva and Parvati; however, early sources state that Virajas, daughter of Ajyapas, was the mother of Yayati. He had five brothers: Yati, Samyati, Ayati, Viyati, and Kriti. Yayāti had conquered the whole world and was the Chakravarti ("Universal Monarch" or "World Emperor").

He married Devayani, the daughter of Shukra, and also took Sharmishtha, daughter of king Vrishaparvan, and the maid of Devayani, as his mistress. Upon hearing of his relationship with Sharmishtha, Devayani complained to her father, who in turn cursed Yayāti to old age in the prime of life, but later allowed him to exchange it with his son, Puru. His story finds mention in the Mahabharata's Adi Parva, as well as in the Bhagavata Purana and the Matsya Purana.

Genealogy and early life
Brahma's son was Atri, a Brahmarshi. Atri's son was Chandra, the moon god. Chandra lent his name to the Lunar dynasty (Chandravaṃśa). Chandra's son was Budha. Budha had a son with Vaivasvaita Manu's daughter, Ila. Ila's son was Pururavas, who studied under Sage Kashyapa. Pururavas married the apsara Urvashi and had many sons, of whom Ayus was the eldest. Ayus completed his education from Sage Chyavana and married the asura princess Prabha. Ayus's son was Nahusha, who was educated by the Sage Vashistha.

Upon Indra's loss of power, the devas asked Nahusha to be the new Indra. Nahusha ruled over the three worlds with the guidance of Sage Brihaspati for 100,000 years. Nahusha's sons, headed by Yati and Yayāti, were educated by thousands of Brahmarshis and the devas who used to wait upon their father. Nahusha eventually became arrogant, and was punished severely, as he was cursed by the saptrishi (seven sages) to be snake and to live further in Naraka (Hell). Indra was once more reinstated as the king of the devas.

The Mahabharata mentions about Yayati's achievements. He performed 100 Rajasuyas, 100 Ashvamedhas, 100 Vajapeyas, 1000 Atiratras, 1000 Pundarikas and innumerable Agnishthomas and Chaturmasyas. Wherever he hurled as Shami stick, he performed as sacrifice. He gave away mountains of gold and billions of cows to Brahmanas.

Legend

The legend of Yayāti appears in the eighteenth and nineteenth chapters of the ninth canto of the Bhagavata Purana.

Yayāti's father, Nahusha, is transformed into a python by a curse uttered by the sages, as punishment for his arrogance. Yayāti's elder brother, Yati, is initially given the kingdom, but turns it down, and instead becomes an ascetic. Yayāti then becomes king in his place and rules the earth. He appoints his four younger brothers to rule the world's cardinal directions.

Marriage 
One day, Sharmishtha, daughter of the daitya king Vrishaparvan, and Devayani, daughter of Shukracharya, go with Sharmishtha's retinue to bathe in a forest pool not far from their home. While they bathe, Indra transforms himself into a strong wind, collecting their clothes upon the stream's banks, and depositing them in a heap. In the ensuing confusion, the two women accidentally don each other's clothes. In the quarrel that ensued, Sharmishtha throws the naked Devayani into a well, and leaves the forest with her retinue. Later, Yayāti, son of Nahusha, chanced upon the pool after hunting, and helps Devayani to climb out of it, before returning to his kingdom. Devayani sent her maid, Ghurnika, to her father, and informed him about the quarrel. Shukra is enraged, and to placate him, Vrishaparvan agrees to offer a thousand maids, along with his daughter Sharmishtha, to serve Devayani. Some time afterwards, Yayati meets Devayani again, and the two fall in love. After Shukra offers his consent, the two marry.

When Devayani moves to Yayati's palace after her marriage, Sharmishtha, now her maidservant, also goes along. Shukracharya, however, sternly warns Yayati never to have sex with Sharmishtha.

Curse 
After a long while, Sharmishtha comes to Yayāti, and requests him to give her a child. He refuses, stating that if he were to do so, he would face the wrath of Shukracharya. Nevertheless, Sharmishtha manages to convince him, saying that it would be against dharma if he were to refuse her request; he being the king, it was his responsibility to ensure the needs of the citizens, and she is desperate to have a child. He reluctantly agrees, and they begin an affair, in the hopes that she would conceive. In due course, Devayani gives birth to two sons: Yadu and Turvasu, while Sharmishtha begets three sons: Druhyu, Anudruhyu, and Puru.

Eventually, Devayani learns of her husband's affair with Sharmishtha, and complains to her father. Enraged at his son-in-law's disobedience, Shukracharya curses Yayāti with premature old age in punishment for inflicting such pain upon his daughter. However, on learning Sharmishtha's desire to become a mother, he later relents, telling Yayāti that if he could persuade one of his (Yayāti's) sons to swap ages with him, he will be able to escape the curse, and regain his lost youth for a while. Yayāti asks his sons if one of them would give up his youth to rejuvenate his father, but all refuse except the youngest, Puru (one of his sons by Sharmishtha). In grateful recognition of Puru's filial devotion, Yayāti makes him his legitimate heir, and it is from the line of Puru - later King Puru - that the Kuruvamsha (Kuru dynasty) later arises.

In the words of the story, Yayāti enjoys all the pleasures of the senses 'for a thousand years' and, by experiencing passion to the full, comes to realise its utter futility, saying:  "Know this for certain... not all the food, wealth and women of the world can appease the lust of a single man of uncontrolled senses. Craving for sense-pleasures is not removed but aggravated by indulgence even as ghee poured into fire increases it....One who aspires to peace and happiness should instantly renounce craving and seek instead that which neither grows old, nor ceases - no matter how old the body may become."  Having found wisdom by following the road of excess, Yayāti gratefully returns the youth of his son Puru, and takes back his old age in return, renouncing the world to spend his remaining days as a forest ascetic. His spiritual practices are, at long last, blessed with success and, alone in the deep woods, he is rewarded with ascension to Svarga - the heavenly realm of the righteous, ruled by Indra, that is but one step below the ultimate liberation of moksha.

Afterlife 

Yayati ascended to heaven due to his virtues. He was so virtuous that he could travel many celestial regions. Sometimes, he went to the region of Brahma and sometimes stayed at Amaravati, the region of Indra. One day, when Yayati and Indra were conversing, Indra asked him questions. Indra asked him how many sacrifices he did and whom he was equal to in sacrifices. Yayati boastingly said the number of his sacrifices was innumerable, and proclaimed his superiority. Indra was angered by this bragging, and threw Yayati out of heaven. Yayati begged his pardon, so Indra said even though he would be thrown out of heaven, he would fall amidst virtuous and wise humans. Thus, while Yayati fell from the celestial region, he got stuck in the firmament. His grandsons: Ashtaka, Vasuman, Prattarddana, and Sivi (kings and sons of Mamata or Madhavi) met him. They enquired who he was, and why he was thus. They asked about heaven, about hell, about rebirth. Yayati recited everything. Then, out of compassion, they offered their own meritorious powers to Yayati. With these merits, Yayati attained again the realm of heaven. Five golden chariots arrived and took them to the region of eternal bliss, because of the merits of his grandsons and his own.

Descendants

From Devayani
Yadu gave rise to the Yaduvamsha, the ancestral lineage of Krishna
 Turvasu and his descendants formed the Yavana Kingdom
 Madhavi or Mamata married four times and had one son with each husband. She married Haryaśva, who belonged to the Suryavamsha dynasty; Divodasa, King of Kashi; Ushinara, King of Bhoja, and the Maharishi Vishvamitra. 
With the Ikshvaku King Haryaśva, she had a son named Vasumanas, who became a wealthy king, and practised charity
 With Divodasa, the King of Kaśi, she had the mighty warrior King Pratarddana who acquired weapons from Sage Bharadvaja, and defeated the Haihayas and the Videhas in battle
 With the Bhoja king Ushinara, she had Shibi, who became a Chakravarti and conquered the world, and practised dharma and charity
 With Sage Vishvamitra, she had a son named Ashtaka, who became famous for performing sacrifices and charity

From Sharmishtha
 Druhyu and his descendants, the Vaibhoja Vamsha, according to Tripura tradition, are believed to have formed the Twipra Kingdom.
 Anudruhyu gave rise to a Mleccha tribe, Tusharas (Tukharas), with their kingdom being located in the north west of India as per the epic Mahabharata. In Bhagavata Purana, the Uśīnaras, the Sibi, the Madras, and the Kekayas are the direct descendants of Anudruhyu. Sibi or Sivi is stated to be son of Usinara.
Puru

Another one of his descendants (through Puru) was King Bharata, the son of King Dushyanta and Shakuntala. Further descendants were part of the Kuru Kingdom, including Shantanu, Dhritarashtra, Pandu, Yudhishthira, Abhimanyu, and Parikshit.

Influence
In modern language and usage, trading conscientious behaviour for external gain is sometimes called Yayāti Syndrome.

Yayati, a Marathi novel by V. S. Khandekar, won him  the Sahitya Akademi Award (1960), and a Jnanpith Award (1974).

Playwright Girish Karnad's debut play Yayati (1961) is based on the story of King Yayāti found in the Mahabharata.

See also
 Lunar dynasty
 Kuru
 Puru
 Yaduvamsha

Further reading
 Mahabharata,  Adiparva, verse. 71-80.
 Yayati (Marathi). 1959. 
 Yayati: A Classic Tale of Lust, by V. S. Khandekar (English), Tr. by Y. P. Kulkarni. Orient Paperbacks. .
 Yayati, by Girish Karnad. Oxford University Press.

References

External links

 Story of King Yayati from Mahabharata
 Devayani and Yayati Retold by P. R. Ramachander
 Yayati in Brahma Purana

Characters in Hindu mythology
Mythological kings
Characters in the Mahabharata